Felimida rolani is a species of colourful sea slug, a dorid nudibranch, a marine gastropod mollusk in the family Chromodorididae.

Distribution 
This species occurs in the Atlantic Ocean off Cape Verde.

Description

Ecology

References

 Rolán E., 2005. Malacological Fauna From The Cape Verde Archipelago. Part 1, Polyplacophora and Gastropoda.
 *  Johnson R.F. & Gosliner T.M. (2012) Traditional taxonomic groupings mask evolutionary history: A molecular phylogeny and new classification of the chromodorid nudibranchs. PLoS ONE 7(4): e33479.

Chromodorididae
Gastropods described in 1970
Gastropods of Cape Verde